The Scotia Mine began operating in 1962 and was a subsidiary of the Blue Diamond Coal Company. The mine was located in the Oven Fork Community of Letcher County, about fourteen miles northeast of the town of Cumberland (Harlan County, Kentucky).

The Scotia Mine was originally opened into the Imboden coalbed. In 1975, an additional opening in the form of a concrete lined  foot diameter shaft, 376 feet deep. The lining of the shaft was completed July 21, 1975, and work was begun to install an automatic elevator. On March 9, 1976, the construction  had not yet been completed and the shaft was being used only as an intake air opening. Of 310 employees, 275 worked underground on two coal producing shifts and one maintenance shift per day, 5 days a week. Approximately 2,500 tons of coal were produced daily on six active sections, consisting of five continuous mining sections and one conventional mining section.

The last federal inspection of the Scotia Mine was completed on February 27, 1976. On March 8, 1976, on the evening shift, a Federal Coal Mine Inspector conducted a Health and Safety Technical Inspection.

Scotia Mine Disaster of 1976 
On March 9, 1976, at approximately 11:45 a.m., an explosion caused by coal dust and gasses rocked the Scotia Mine. Two days later, a twin explosion occurred. The first explosion killed fifteen miners; the second killed eleven. Investigators believed that both explosions were caused by methane gasses ignited by a spark in a battery-powered locomotive or another electric device. A lack of ventilation also contributed to the accidents.

The explosions at Scotia led to the passage of the Federal Mine Safety and Health Act of 1977. This law strengthened the previously passed 1969 act. The 1977 law also moved the Mine Safety and Health Administration from the Department of the Interior to the Department of Labor.

Historical Marker #2314 in Letcher County notes the tragic mine explosions that occurred at Scotia Mine in 1976. The accidents are noted as being one of the worst mine disasters in U.S. history.

Lives lost in Scotia Mine Disaster 

 Glenn Barker, 29 years-old
 Dennis Boggs, 27 years-old
 Everett Scott Combs, 29 years-old
 Virgil Coots, 24 years-old
 Don Creech, 30 years-old
 Larry David McKnight, 28 years-old
 Earl Galloway, 44 years-old
 David Gibbs, 30 years-old
 Robert Griffith, 24 years-old
 John Hackworth, 29 years-old
 J. B. Holbrook, 43 years-old
 Kenneth B. Kiser, 45 years-old
 Roy McKnight, 31 years-old
 Lawrence Peavy, 25 years-old
 Carl Polly, 47 years-old
 Richard M. Sammons, 55 years-old
 Tommy Ray Scott, 24 years-old
 Ivan Gail Sparkman, 34 years-old
 James Sturgill, 46 years-old
 Jimmy W. Sturgill, 20 years-old
 Monroe Sturgill, 40 years-old
 Kenneth Turner, 25 years-old
 Willie D. Turner, 25 years-old
 Grover Tussey, 45 years-old
 Denver Widner, 31 years-old
 James Williams, 23 years-old

Lawsuit 
In 1977, the widows of the miners who died in the mine disaster (the Scotia widows) sued Blue Diamond Coal Company of Knoxville, Tennessee. The United States District Court judge Howard David Hermansdorfer for the Eastern District of Kentucky ruled that Blue Diamond Coal Company was exempt from tort liability under Kentucky's Workmen's Compensation Act and dismissed the lawsuit. The Court of Appeals for the Sixth Circuit held that, under Kentucky's Workmen's Compensation Act a parent corporation is not immune from tort liability to its subsidiary employees for its own, independent acts of negligence.

Further reading 

 Historical Summary of Coal Mine Explosions in the United States, 1959–1981, United States Department of the Interior.
 Kentucky: Past and Present by Colleen Ryckert Cook.
 The Scotia Widows: Inside Their Lawsuit Against Big Daddy Coal by Gerald Mann Stern.

References 

Coal mines in the United States
Coal mining disasters in Kentucky